Haminoeidae, commonly known as the haminoeid bubble snail family, is a taxonomic family of sea snails, marine opisthobranch gastropod mollusks in the superfamily Haminoeoidea.

The name of this family has long been controversial, and used to be Atyidae or Atydidae. Another, but incorrect, spelling was Haminaeidae (See (ICZN) 2000. Opinion 1942).

A number of genera have been proposed for this family, but the species are hard to identify (or sometimes impossible to identify) by looking only at the external characteristics. Until the internal anatomy of 'wet' specimens has been fully described, the status of many of the genera listed here is uncertain.

Distribution
These bubble snails occur in all warm or temperate seas.

Habitat
These are sand dwellers or they live on muddy bottoms, in bays, estuaries, and close to the shore in tidepools.

Description of the live animal
These are colorful snails, that can partially take the color of the sea floor.

Their large cephalic shield is rounded at the front, but deeply lobed behind. The mantle protrudes behind the shell. The shell is partially or completely enfolded by lateral parapodial (=fleshy winglike outgrowths) lobes.

Shell description
Their shell varies in size according to the species, from 3 mm to 30 mm.

The shell is ovoid, thin and translucent. It may be smooth or have spiral grooves (striae). The umbilical apex is sunken or enclosed and no longer visible. Large body whorl with fine spiral striations. Smooth columella. The thin outer lip of the aperture extends beyond the apex of the shell and is thus longer than the body whorl. The aperture narrows posteriorly and is wider anteriorly.

Ecology
These snails are herbivorous. Their diet consists of various kinds of green algae. They can survive in brackish water.

They are hermaphrodites. Their eggs are deposited in round or oval jellylike strings, attached to eelgrass or sand.

Atys naucum and Atys cylindricum are known to show biological fluorescence.

Genera and species
Genera within the family Haminoeidae include:
 Aliculastrum Pilsbry, 1896
 Atys Montfort, 1810
 Bakawan Oskars & Malaquias, 2019
 Bullacta Bergh, 1901 - with the only species: Bullacta exarata (Philippi, 1849)
 Cylichnatys Kuroda & Habe, 1952
 Diniatys Iredale, 1936
 Haloa  Pilsbry, 1921
 Haminella Thiele, 1925
Haminoea Turton & Kingston in Carrington, 1830 
 Lamprohaminoea Habe, 1952
Liloa Pilsbry, 1921 
 Papawera Oskars & Malaquias, 2019
 Phanerophthalmus A. Adams, 1850 
 Roxaniella Monterosato, 1884
 Sericohaminoea Habe, 1952: synonym of Haloa  Pilsbry, 1921
 Smaragdinella A. Adams, 1848
 Vellicolla Oskars, Too, Rees, P. M. Mikkelsen, Willassen & Malaquias, 2019
 Weinkauffia Monterosato, 1884
Genera brought into synonymy
 Atyscaphander Annandale, 1924: synonym of Bullacta Bergh, 1901
 Austrocylichna Burn, 1974: synonym of Roxaniella Monterosato, 1884
 Dinia H. Adams & A. Adams, 1854: synonym of Diniatys Iredale, 1936
 Haminea Gray, 1847: synonym of Haminoea Turton & Kingston in Carrington, 1830
 Limulatys Iredale, 1936: synonym of Weinkauffia Weinkauff, 1873
 Nipponatys Habe, 1952; synonym of Aliculastrum Pilsbry, 1896
 Sinohaminea Tchang, 1933: synonym of Bullacta Bergh, 1901
 Sphaeratys F. Nordsieck, 1972: synonym of Oxygyrus Benson, 1835
 Ventomnestia Iredale, 1936: synonym of Mnestia H. Adams & A. Adams, 1854
Brought to another family
 Micratys Habe, 1952: belongs to the family [unassigned] Cephalaspidea 
 Mimatys Habe, 1952: belongs to the family Alacuppidae.
 Mnestia H. Adams & A. Adams, 1854; belongs to the family Mnestiidae 

Genus Diniatys
Diniatys dentifer A. Adams, 1850 - Distribution: Indo-Pacific, Length : 10 mm, Description : this herbivore is found on the bluegreen algae Lyngbya majuscula, Schizothrix and Hormothamnion. There is a pointed projection on the columella. The color varies between green and various shades of brown. The two black eyes are on the back of the cephalic shield.
Diniatys monodonta A. Adams, 1850
Distribution: Japan
Genus Haloa
Haloa binotata (H. A. Pilsbry, 1895) 
Distribution : Indo Pacific
Haloa constricta A. Adams, 1850 
Distribution : Japan
Haloa crocata W. H. Pease, 1860 
Distribution : Hawaii
Haloa flavescens (A. Adams, 1850) 
Distribution : Indo Pacific
Haloa fusca W. H. Pease, 1863 
Distribution : Indo Pacific
Haloa japonica H. A. Pilsbry, 1895 Japanese Paper-bubble
Distribution : Indo Pacific, Japan
Length : 10 mm
Description : species with beautiful colors : glassy white background with tiny white spots and dark patches with orange dots.
Haloa kawamurai T. Habe, 1950 
Distribution : Indo Pacific
Haloa margaritoides T. Kuroda & T. Habe, 1971 
Distribution : Japan
Length : 7 mm
Description : intertidal among seaweeds
Haloa nigripunctata W. H. Pease, 1868 
Distribution : Japan
Haloa rotundata A. Adams, 1850 
Distribution : Japan
Haloa vitrea (A. Adams, 1850) 
Distribution : Japan
Haloa yamaguchii T. Habe, 1952 
Distribution : Indo Pacific
Genus Hamineobulla Habe, 1950 (incertae sedis; may be belong to the family Bullidae)
Hamineobulla kawamurai Habe, 1950
Distribution : Okinawa
Length : 6 mm
Description : brown animal with short cephalic shield; on the shell there are a few transverse rows with brighter dots
Genus Liloa Pilsbry, 1921
Since most of these bubble snails were named on the basis of the shell alone, the occurrence of synonyms among the following species is quite possible.
Liloa brevis (Quoy & Gaimard, 1833)
Distribution : Australia
Description : elongate body; parapodial flaps cover only the front of the thin, fragile shell
Liloa curta (A. Adams, 1850)
Distribution : Western Pacific
Description : elongate body; the color can vary from a few dark spots on a translucent body, to almost completely dark.
Liloa incisula Yokoyama, 1928 
Distribution : Japan
Liloa laeta A. A. Gould, 1859 
Distribution : Indo Pacific
Liloa nipponensis Nomura & Hatai, 1940 
Distribution : Japan
Liloa porcellana A. A. Gould, 1859 
Distribution : Japan
Liloa tomaculum H. A. Pilsbry, 1951 
Distribution : Hawaiian Islands
Liloa translucens A. Adams, 1862 
Distribution : Japan
Genus Limulatys Iredale, 1936
Limulatys constrictus T. Habe, 1952 
Distribution : Indo Pacific
Length : 16 mm
Limulatys crassilabris (J. Thiele, 1925)
Distribution : S.E. Asia, Thailand
Length : 8 mm
Limulatys fusiformis T. Habe, 1952 
Distribution : Japan
Limulatys muscarius A. A. Gould, 1859
Distribution : Indo Pacific, Philippines
Limulatys okamotoi T. Habe, 1952 
Distribution : Indo Pacific
Limulatys ooformis T. Habe, 1964 Egg-shaped Bubble
Distribution : Indo Pacific, Philippines, Thailand
Length : 20 mm
Limulatys okamotoi Habe, 1952
Distribution : Philippines
Length : 9 mm
Limulatys reliquus Iredale, 1936 
Distribution : New Zealand
Limulatys scobriculatus A. Adams, 1862 
Distribution : Japan
Limulatys tortuosus A. Adams, 1850 
Distribution : Japan
Genus Micratys Habe, 1952
Micratys ovum T. Habe, 1952 
Distribution : Japan, Philippines
Length : 2 mm
Genus Mimatys Habe, 1952
Mimatys fukuokaensis T. Habe, 1952 
Distribution : Japan, Philippines
Length : 2.5 mm
Genus Nipponatys Kurida & Habe, 1952
Nipponatys amakusaensis T. Habe & Kikuchi, 1960 
Distribution : Japan
Nipponatys oshimai T. Habe & Kikuchi, 1960 
Nipponatys volvulina A. Adams, 1862 
Distribution : Japan
Genus Sericohaminoea Habe, 1952
Genus Sphaeratys F. Nordsieck, 1972 (?)
Genus Ventomnestia
Ventomnestia bizona (A. Adams, 1850)
Ventomnestia colorata Iredale, 1936
Ventomnestia villica (Gould, 1859) (may be a synonym of Ventomnestia bizona)
Distribution : Guam
Length : 5.5 mm
Description : a bubble snail with a great variation in color, from white to brown, but always with a characteristic pattern; heavy shell; radula formula : 2.1.2; 
Genus Weinkauffia A. Adams, 1858
Weinkauffia diaphana A. Aradas & Maggiore, 1839 
Distribution : West Africa
Description : has similar gizzard plates as Atys multistriatus
Weinkauffia turgidula Forbes, 1844 
Distribution : Adriatic Sea, Malta, Turkey
Length : 5 mm
Description : fossils of this species have been found in sediments of Pliocene age in Italy.

References

 Vaught, K.C. (1989). A classification of the living Mollusca. American Malacologists: Melbourne, FL (USA). . XII, 195 pp